Adolphe Hennebains (14 November 1862 – 17 September 1914) was a French classical flautist and music teacher.

Biography 
Hennebains comes from a large shoemaker family. In 1878, he entered the class of Joseph-Henri Altès at the Conservatoire de Paris and received his first prize in 1880. The same year, he was a solo flute player at the Pasdeloup Orchestra and - after his military service - in 1884, solo flute to the Concerts Lamoureux. In 1890, he joined the Orchestre de l'Opéra national de Paris where he was flute solo in 1892. From 1893, Hennebains was assistant to Paul Taffanel at the Conservatoire de Paris and his successor during the 1909 summer. Among his pupils were René Le Roy, Marcel Moyse and Joseph Rampal. As chamber music partner, Hennebains played with Ferruccio Busoni, Alfred Cortot, George Enescu and Wanda Landowska.

Bibliography 
  András Adorján, Lenz Meierott (ed.), Lexique de la Flûte, Laaber-Verl., Laaber 2009,

External links 
  Adolphe Hennebains on Robert Bigio flute pages
  Biography of Adolphe Hennebains on Flutepage.de
  Adolphe Hennebains in Marcel Moyse: Voice of the Flute
  ADOLPHE HENNEBAINS (flute) on CHARM

1862 births
People from Saint-Omer
1914 deaths
Conservatoire de Paris alumni
Academic staff of the Conservatoire de Paris
French classical flautists
19th-century classical musicians